Code of Honor is a 1930 American western film directed by J.P. McGowan and starring Mahlon Hamilton, Doris Hill and Lafe McKee.

Synopsis
Cardsharp Jack Cardigan goes straight when he falls in love with Doris Bradfield, but then finds his old skills are in need one more time to assist her father.

Cast
 Mahlon Hamilton as Jack Cardigan
 Doris Hill as Doris Bradfield
 Robert Graves as Jed Harden
 Stanley Taylor as Tom Bradfield
 Lafe McKee as 	Dad Bradfield
 Jimmy Aubrey as 	Nosey 
 Harry Holden as 	Lawyer Slack
 William J. Dyer as 	Sheriff Asa Smyth
 Barney Beasley as Barfly 
 Milton Brown as 	Barfly 
 Frank Clark as Dealer with Visor 
 Alfred Hewston as 	Barfly
 Cliff Lyons as Ranch Hand 
 Blackie Whiteford as Blackie - Card Player

References

Bibliography
 Pitts, Michael R. Poverty Row Studios, 1929–1940. McFarland & Company, 2005.

External links
 

1930 films
1930 Western (genre) films
1930s English-language films
American Western (genre) films
Films directed by J. P. McGowan
American black-and-white films
1930s American films